The City and County of Denver, capital of the U.S. state of Colorado, has 78 official neighborhoods as of January 2013. In addition to the official administrative neighborhoods, many residents have names for local neighborhoods that may not conform to the boundaries of official neighborhoods. Denver does not have any official larger area designations, unlike the City of Chicago for example, which has larger areas that house the neighborhoods (IE: Northwest Side). Denver residents use the terms "north" "south" "east" and "west" loosely, and the neighborhoods as categorized below reflect this.

Central

 Baker
 Capitol Hill
 Central Business District
 Cheesman Park
 Cherry Creek
 City Park
 City Park West
 Civic Center
 Congress Park
 Country Club
 Lincoln Park
 North Capitol Hill
 Speer
 Union Station

East

 Belcaro
 Cory-Merrill
 East Colfax
 Hale
 Hilltop
 Indian Creek
 Lowry
 Montclair
 Park Hill
 Virginia Village
 Washington Virginia Vale
 Windsor

North

 Clayton
 Cole
 Elyria-Swansea
 Five Points
 Globeville
 North Park Hill
 Skyland
 South Park Hill
 Whittier

Northeast

 Central Park
 Denver International Airport
 Gateway/Green Valley Ranch
 Montbello
 Northeast Park Hill

Northwest

 Auraria
 Berkeley
 Chaffee Park
 Highland
 Jefferson Park
 Regis
 Sloan Lake
 Sunnyside
 West Highland

South

 College View/South Platte
 Overland
 Platt Park
 Rosedale
 University
 University Hills
 University Park
 Washington Park
 Washington Park West
 Wellshire

Southeast
 Goldsmith
 Hampden
 Hampden South
 Kennedy
 Southmoor Park

Southwest
 Bear Valley
 Fort Logan
 Harvey Park
 Harvey Park South
 Marston

West

 Athmar Park
 Barnum
 Barnum West
 Mar Lee
 Ruby Hill
 Sun Valley
 Valverde
 Villa Park
 West Colfax
 Westwood

Non-official Neighborhoods

 Alamo Placita — A historic district, part of the larger Speer neighborhood.
 Ballpark District - An active area that includes Coors Field and several blocks east, part of the Five Points neighborhood.
 Burns Brentwood
 Crestmoor
 Curtis Park
 Golden Triangle — An area which incorporates many of Denver's civic and cultural institutions, roughly corresponds with the Civic Center neighborhood.
 Hampden Heights
 LoDo — Original settlement of Denver, with many of its oldest buildings and is known for its nightlife, overlaps parts of the Union Station and Five Points neighborhoods.
 Mayfair
 Parkfield
 RiNo
 Northside
 South Denver
 Uptown — Roughly corresponds with North Capitol Hill neighborhood.

See also

 Denver
 Colorado

References

External links
 City of Denver: Maps - Neighborhoods
 City of Denver: Community Planning and Development
 City of Denver: Office of Economic Development - Neighborhood Profiles
 List of Denver neighborhoods with descriptions, maps, homes - useful information for newcomers

 
Denver
Neighborhoods